Samuel Dalen Selås (born 17 April 1998) is a Norwegian sailor from Arendal, Norway. He sails a Europe dinghy, and he has competed in the World Cup where he sailed in to the 60th place. In order to qualify for the World Cup, Samuel participated in the Open week.

References

1998 births
Living people
Norwegian sailors
People from Arendal